The 2013–14 Azerbaijan First Division  is the second-level of football in Azerbaijan. The season was started on 10 September 2013 and there were sixteen teams participating in the league. Ağsu were the defending champions.

Teams
Turan-T were relegated for the first time in their history, after twenty years in Azerbaijan Premier League, the longest period in its history. On 21 August 2013, it was announced that Araz and Karvan after reformation will join the first division, while Qala and Taraggi will not participate after becoming defunct.

On 10 September 2013, Mil-Muğan also joined the league, while Turan's name changed to Turan-T.

Stadia and locations
''Note: Table lists in alphabetical order.

Personnel and kits

Note: Flags indicate national team as has been defined under FIFA eligibility rules. Players may hold more than one non-FIFA nationality.

League table

Results

Season statistics

Top scorers

Hat-tricks

 5 Player scored 5 goals

References

External links
 pfl.az
 AFFA 

Azerbaijan First Division seasons
Azerbaijan First Division
2